The Sony α NEX-5R is a mid-range rangefinder-styled digital mirrorless interchangeable lens camera announced by Sony on 29 August 2012.

See also
List of Sony E-mount cameras
Sony NEX-5
Sony NEX-7

References
http://www.dpreview.com/products/sony/slrs/sony_nex5r/specifications

NEX-5R
NEX-5R
Live-preview digital cameras
Cameras introduced in 2012